Carlos Miguel Jesus Teixeira (born March 11, 1976) is a volleyball player from Portugal, who plays as a libero for the Men's National Team. He became Best Digger at the second 2008 Olympic Qualification Tournament in Espinho, where Portugal ended up in second place and missed qualification for the 2008 Summer Olympics in Beijing, PR China.

Honours
2002 World Championship — 8th place
2008 Olympic Qualification Tournament — 2nd place (did not qualify)

References
 FIVB biography

1976 births
Living people
Portuguese men's volleyball players
Place of birth missing (living people)
Sportspeople from Matosinhos